The 2009 Manta Open – Trofeo Ricardo Delgado Aray was a professional tennis tournament played on outdoor hard courts. It was part of the 2009 ATP Challenger Tour. It took place in Manta, Ecuador between 20 and 26 July 2009.

Singles entrants

Seeds

 Rankings are as of July 13, 2009.

Other entrants
The following players received wildcards into the singles main draw:
  Patricio Alvarado
  Alejo Apud
  Mariano Zabaleta

The following players received entry from the qualifying draw:
  Bruno Echagaray
  Gonzalo Escobar
  Emilio Gómez
  Guido Pella

Champions

Singles

 Horacio Zeballos def.  Vincent Millot, 3–6, 7–5, 6–3

Doubles

 Ricardo Hocevar /  André Miele def.  Santiago González /  Horacio Zeballos, 6–1, 2–6, [10–7]

References
Official website
ITF Search 

Manta Open
Manta Open